The Fragile Promise of Choice: Abortion in the United States Today  is a documentary film by  Dorothy Fadiman which examines abortion rights and access in the U.S. in 1996 which was 23 years after the legislative decision, Roe vs. Wade.   Dorothy narrated the film which featured interviews with abortion care providers and news clips, including one of Dr. George Tiller.  It is the last of three films called the Trilogy on Reproductive Rights or the From the Back-Alleys to the Supreme Court & Beyond Trilogy.

References

External links 
 
 The Fragile Promise of Choice: Abortion in the U.S. Today at vimeo.com
 The Fragile Promise of Choice: Abortion in the U.S. Today (Spanish subtitles) (1996)  at archive.org
 The Fragile Promise of Choice: Abortion in the U.S. Today  on imdb.com
 The Film's Page from The New York Times

1996 films
American documentary films
Abortion in the United States
Documentary films about abortion
Documentary films about American politics
Films directed by Dorothy Fadiman
1996 documentary films
1990s English-language films
1990s American films